Usagara is an administrative ward in Tanga District of Tanga Region in Tanzania.
According to the 2012 census, the ward has a total population of 10,330. And Peter Mareko Fundi of Kizingo is the Chief minister. He took over from Chief Javanso. Dumebi is eyeing the seat.

References

Wards of Tanga Region